Franklin Street Commercial Historic District is a national historic district located at Michigan City, LaPorte County, Indiana.  The district encompasses 73 contributing buildings and 1 contributing object in the central business district and surrounding residential section of Michigan City. It developed between about 1875 and 1955, and includes examples of Italianate, Gothic Revival, Queen Anne, Classical Revival, and Tudor Revival style architecture.  Located in the district is the separately listed Michigan City Post Office (1909-1910).  Other notable buildings include the Staiger House (c. 1908), Earl House (c. 1890, 1917), M & M Diner (1955), Zorn Building (1907), St. Paul's Lutheran Church (1876) and rectory (1888), First Federal Savings Bank (c. 1950), Aicher Block (1914), Brinkman Building (c. 1917), Trinity Episcopal Church (1889), Merchants National Bank Building (1926), Ledbetter Building (1908), Rodenbeck Saloon (c. 1894), First Methodist Episcopal Church (1922), Barker Hall (1929), Masonic Temple (1922-1923), and the Salvation Army Building (1925).

It was listed in the National Register of Historic Places in 2013.

References

Michigan City, Indiana
Historic districts on the National Register of Historic Places in Indiana
Houses on the National Register of Historic Places in Indiana
Italianate architecture in Indiana
Gothic Revival architecture in Indiana
Queen Anne architecture in Indiana
Neoclassical architecture in Indiana
Tudor Revival architecture in Indiana
Historic districts in LaPorte County, Indiana
National Register of Historic Places in LaPorte County, Indiana